The year 2005 is the 5th year in the history of World Extreme Cagefighting, a mixed martial arts promotion based in the United States. In 2005 WEC held 5 events beginning with, WEC 13: Heavyweight Explosion.

Title fights

Tournament Winners

Events list

WEC 13: Heavyweight Explosion

WEC 13: Heavyweight Explosion was an event held on January 22, 2005 at the Tachi Palace in Lemoore, California, United States.

Results

WEC 14: Vengeance

WEC 14: Vengeance was an event held on March 17, 2005 at the Tachi Palace in Lemoore, California, United States.

Results

WEC 15: Judgment Day

WEC 15: Judgment Day was an event held on May 19, 2005 at the Tachi Palace in Lemoore, California, United States.

Results

WEC 16: Clash of the Titans 2

WEC 16: Clash of the Titans 2 was an event held on August 18, 2005 at the Tachi Palace in Lemoore, California, United States.

Results

WEC 17: Halloween Fury 4

WEC 17: Halloween Fury 4 was an event held on October 14, 2005 at the Tachi Palace in Lemoore, California, United States.

Results

See also 
 World Extreme Cagefighting
 List of World Extreme Cagefighting champions
 List of WEC events

References

World Extreme Cagefighting events
2005 in mixed martial arts